Mileta Radulović (born 29 January 1981) is a Montenegrin retired football goalkeeper.

Club career
Born in Titograd, he has played with FK Mladost Podgorica, FK Sutjeska Nikšić, FK Čelik Nikšić, FK Zeta, Serbian side FK BASK, Bosnian FK Željezničar Sarajevo, FK Crvena Stijena, FK Budućnost Podgorica, OFK Bar and OFK Grbalj.

References

External links
 

1981 births
Living people
Footballers from Podgorica
Association football goalkeepers
Serbia and Montenegro footballers
Montenegrin footballers
OFK Titograd players
FK Sutjeska Nikšić players
FK Čelik Nikšić players
FK Zeta players
FK BASK players
FK Željezničar Sarajevo players
FK Crvena Stijena players
FK Budućnost Podgorica players
OFK Bar players
OFK Grbalj players
OFK Petrovac players
Second League of Serbia and Montenegro players
First League of Serbia and Montenegro players
Premier League of Bosnia and Herzegovina players
Montenegrin First League players
Montenegrin expatriate footballers
Expatriate footballers in Bosnia and Herzegovina
Montenegrin expatriate sportspeople in Bosnia and Herzegovina